Noctueliopsis aridalis is a moth in the family Crambidae. It was described by William Barnes and Foster Hendrickson Benjamin in 1922. It is found in North America, where it has been recorded from Arizona, California and Nevada. The habitat consists of deserts.

The length of the forewings is 5.5-6.5 mm. Adults have been recorded on wing from March to June.

References

Moths described in 1922
Odontiini